Claude Black may refer to:

 Claude Black (minister) (1916–2009), American Baptist minister
 Claude Black (musician) (1932–2013), American jazz pianist